This is a list of seasons completed by the Ohio State men's college basketball team.

Season-by-season results

  34 games vacated by the NCAA (overall record of 27–9, conference record of 12–4). Adjusted record is 1–1 and 1–1 in conference.
  16 games vacated by the NCAA, as well as conference regular season championship (overall record of 22–7, conference record of 13–3). Adjusted record is 11–3 and 5–1 in conference.
  Entire season vacated by the NCAA (overall record of 20–11, conference record of 11–5)
  Entire season vacated by the NCAA, as well as conference regular season and tournament championship (overall record of 24–8, conference record of 11–5)
  O'Brien's unofficial record is 133–88 at Ohio State; his adjusted record is 51–57 and 20–36 in conference.

References

 
Ohio State
Ohio State Buckeyes basketball seasons